Helen Grobert (born 11 April 1992 in Filderstadt) is a German cross-country cyclist. She placed 12th in the women's cross-country race at the 2016 Summer Olympics.

References

External links 
 
 
 
 

1992 births
Living people
German female cyclists
Olympic cyclists of Germany
Cyclists at the 2016 Summer Olympics
People from Filderstadt
Sportspeople from Stuttgart (region)
Cyclists from Baden-Württemberg